Rose Amoanimaa Yeboah (born December 23, 2001) is a Ghanaian high jumper. She has competed at world championships, most recently at the 2019 African Games in Rabat, Morocco.

Yeboah first gained international experience in 2019 at the XIV African U20 Championships in Abidjan, where she won the gold medal in high jump with a height of 1.83 m. In August, she also competed at the 2019 African Games in Rabat, increasing by one centimeter and thus also won another gold medal in the high jump event. Prior to that she represented Ghana and won gold medals at both Ecowas U-20 Championships in Abidjan and the All-Africa University Games in Egypt.

Other sports that she plays are hockey and basketball. In high school, her team Kumasi Girls Senior High School won gold at the Spriteball Championship, where she won MVP.

Education  
She had her secondary education at Kumasi Girls Senior High School. She is currently a student of University of Cape Coast.

Personal bests 
 High jump: 1.83 m, April 2019 CAA U-18 and U-20 Abidjan.
High jump: 1.84 m, 27 August 2019 in Rabat.
High jump: 1.85 m, January 2020 GUSA Games Legon.

References

External links 

Living people
2001 births
Ghanaian female high jumpers
Athletes (track and field) at the 2019 African Games
African Games gold medalists in athletics (track and field)
African Games gold medalists for Ghana
African Championships in Athletics winners